Imre Makovecz (November 20, 1935 – September 27, 2011) was a Hungarian architect active in Europe from the late 1950s onward.

Makovecz was born and died in Budapest. He attended the Technical University of Budapest. He was founder and "eternal and executive president" of the Hungarian Academy of Arts. He was an award-winning architect, having won Ybl Prize, Kossuth Prize, Steindl Imre Prize and Prima Primissima Award among many others.

Makovecz was one of the most prominent proponents of organic architecture.  As such, his buildings attempt to work with the natural surroundings rather than triumph over them. Frank Lloyd Wright and Rudolf Steiner are both strong influences, as is traditional Hungarian art.

His work began as a critique of communist ideology and the brutal uniformity of system building, but after the fall of the Communist regime in 1989, it became a comment on the nature of globalisation and corporate culture.  In its attempts to refer to and build on Hungarian national archetypes, Makovecz was continuing the work and ideas of the architects of Hungarian Art Nouveau and National Romanticism.  The first English language monograph on his work, Imre Makovecz: T.e Wings of the Soul, by Edwin Heathcote, was published in 1997. More recently, his work has been examined in the broader context of Hungarian culture to which also belongs organic cinema.

Makovecz was a devout Roman Catholic.

Makovecz's key works

 Cultural Center, Sárospatak  (completed in 1982)
 Sports Hall, Visegrád  (1985)
 Town Hall and Commercial Center of Dunajská Streda
 Community Center, Kakasd  (1996)
 His group designed the buildings of the Piliscsaba campus of Pázmány Péter Catholic University.
 Hungarian pavilion at the Seville Expo '92 in Seville, Spain
 House, Recsk

Other important works

 Restaurant, Berhida (1964)
 Shark Restaurant, Velence (1965)
 Fisherman's Inn, Szekszárd (1965)
 Cottages, Balatonszepezd (1965)
 Inn, Tatabánya (1966)
 Restaurant, Gyulavár (1969)
 Cultural Centre, Sárospatak (1972)
 Restaurant, Szentendre (1973)
 Funeral Chapel, Farkasréti Cemetery (1975)
 Tourist Lodges, Visegrád (1977)
 Camping Complex and Recreation Centre, Visegrád, Mogyoró Hill (1978)
 Ski-lift House, Dobogókő (1979)
 Farm and Restaurant, Visegrád (1980)
 Cultural Centre, Jászapáti (1983)
 Community Centre, Bak (1985)
 Cultural Centre, Szigetvár (1985)
 Church, Siófok (1986)
 Holy Spirit Church, Paks (1987)
Secondary School, Sárospatak (1988)
 Ecological Centre, Überlingen, Germany (1989)
 Hungarian Pavilion, Universal Exposition Sevilla 1992, Sevilla, Spain (1992)
 Theatre and Hungarian Community Center, Lendava, Slovenia (1991–2004)
 Stephaneum, Piliscsaba (1995)
 Church, Százhalombatta (1995)
 OnionHouse Theatre, Makó (1995)
 Funeral Chapel, Sfântu Gheorghe Romania (1996)
 Swimming Pool, Eger (2000)
 Roman Catholic Church, Miercurea Ciuc Romania (2001)
 Reformed church on Donath street, Cluj Romania (2008)
 His group also oversaw the Eco-Shelter on the Trust for Urban Ecology site in Stave Hill Park, Rotherhithe, London, 1992. In association with the Prince's Trust
 Pancho Arena, Felcsút (2014)

Gallery

References

External links 

 
 
 Gallery from Danish architecture site 

1935 births
2011 deaths
Architects from Budapest
Ecclesiastical architects
Hungarian Roman Catholics
Organic architecture
20th-century Hungarian architects
21st-century Hungarian architects
Burials at Farkasréti Cemetery